Pink salt may refer to:
 Any salt that is pink in color
 Himalayan salt, a form of salt used in cooking or in bath products
 Alaea salt, an unrefined Hawaiian sea salt used in cooking or in rituals
 Curing salt, containing sodium nitrite and sodium chloride, used in the curing of meats